Haji Alakbar Mosque was an Azerbaijani mosque located in Fuzuli, Azerbaijan. The mosque is also spelt as Haji Alekber Mosque. The Haji Alakbar mosque was constructed in 1890 by the renowned architect of the time Karbalayi Safikhan Karabakhi who also built Yukhari Govhar Agha Mosque and Ashaghi Govhar Agha Mosque in Shusha, Aghdam Mosque in Aghdam, mosques in Horadiz and Qocahmadli villages, Tatar mosque in Odessa, Ukraine, and Qababaghlilar Mosque in Ashgabat, Turkmenistan. This monument of Islamic architecture is among 300 religious monuments of Karabakh and is famous for its structure along with Qiyas ad Din Mosque, also located in Fuzuli. Fuzuli, along with the Haji Alakbar Mosque was occupied by Armenian forces in 1993, and its condition was unknown during the occupation. However, after the recapture of the city by Azerbaijan, it was found to be destroyed.

References

External links
Karabakh Monuments

1890 establishments in the Russian Empire
19th-century mosques
Destroyed mosques
Mosques in Azerbaijan
Mosques completed in 1890
Karbalayi Safikhan Karabakhi buildings and structures